Smurthwaite is an English surname that may refer to the following notable people:
James Smurthwaite (1916–1989), English first-class cricketer
Kate Smurthwaite, British comedian and political activist
Norman Smurthwaite (born 1960), English businessman and former football club chairman

English-language surnames